Alb-Donau-Kreis is a  (district) in Baden-Württemberg, Germany. It is bounded by (from the south and clockwise) the districts of Biberach, Reutlingen, Göppingen and Heidenheim, the two Bavarian districts Günzburg and Neu-Ulm, and the city of Ulm.

History 

The history of the region is linked with the history of Ulm and the Swabian Jura.

Listing of towns and municipalities in the former Ulm district:

The district of Alb-Donau was established in 1973 by merging the former districts of Ulm and Ehingen, some municipalities of the Münsingen district and the municipalities of Oberbalzheim and Unterbalzheim of the Biberach district.

Geography 

The city of Ulm is surrounded by the district. It is the administrative seat of the Alb-Donau district, although it is not part of the district.

The district is named after the Danube River and the Swabian Jura mountains. The Danube enters the district in the southwest, runs through the southern parts of the district and leaves eastwards to Ulm. North of the Danube banks, the hills of the Swabian Jura rise. The hill chain extends from southwest to northeast parallel to the course of the Danube River and is continued on either side of the district. An affluent of the Danube, the Iller River, forms the southeastern border of the Alb-Donau district, before it meets the Danube in Ulm.

Coat of arms 
The coat of arms is identical to the coat of arms of the former district of Ulm. The eagle was the heraldic animal of the Free Imperial City of Ulm. The shield displays the deer antlers of Württemberg and the red and white stripes of the Austrian county of Burgau (which the southern parts of the district once belonged to).

Towns and municipalities

References

External links 

 (German)

 
Tübingen (region)
Districts of Baden-Württemberg
Württemberg